Melica schafkatii, is a species of grass that can be found in Central Asia.

Description
The species is perennial and have elongated rhizomes. The species leaf-sheaths are tubular with one of their length being closed.

Fertile spikelets are pediceled, the pedicels of which are filiform, pubescent and curved. Florets are diminished at the apex.

Palea is 2-veined. Flowers are fleshy, oblong, truncate, have 2 lodicules, and grow together.

References

schafkatii
Flora of Central Asia